Voices is the twenty-fourth studio album by American singer-songwriter Judy Collins, released in 1995 by Wildflowers Music.

Overview
The album features classic original Collins' songs in new arrangements. The very first edition of the album included a CD, a collection of sheet music and an eighty-page memoir, its chapters are devoted to songs, in which the singer not only explains the inspiration for the songs, but extrapolates to memories of her life. The album features a new song "Voices", designed to draw attention to children in the midst of wars around the world.

Track listing

References

External links
 

1995 albums
Judy Collins albums